Oak Creek Canyon is a river gorge located in northern Arizona between the cities of Flagstaff and Sedona. The canyon is often described as a smaller cousin of the Grand Canyon because of its scenic beauty. State Route 89A enters the canyon on its north end via a series of hairpin turns before traversing the bottom of the canyon for about  until the highway enters the town of Sedona.

Geography
However, due to the faulting that played a major role in its formation, the west rim of the canyon is  higher than the east rim.

Oak Creek
Oak Creek, a tributary of the Verde River, flows along the bottom of the canyon, and is one of the few perennial streams in the high desert region of northern Arizona.

Oak Creek enters more open country below Sedona.
In June 2006, the southern portion of the canyon, near Slide Rock State Park, was affected by a  wildfire known as the "Brins Fire".

Geology

Geologic evidence suggests the formation of an ancestral Oak Creek Canyon along the Oak Creek Fault about eight to ten million years ago. The ancestral Oak Creek Canyon was then filled in by gravel deposits and a series of lava flows between 6–8 million years ago during the Miocene Epoch. About this time, the Oak Creek Fault became active again and the modern Oak Creek Canyon began to develop along the fault zone as a result of the erosional action of Oak Creek. The normal, down-to-the-east motion of the Oak Creek Fault during the most recent faulting period resulted in the west rim of the canyon being about  higher than the east rim.

The spectacularly eroded walls of the canyon are formed mostly of Paleozoic sedimentary rocks. Exposures of the Kaibab Limestone, (the geologic formation found at the top of the Grand Canyon), and the Toroweap Formation are found only at the northern end of the canyon. The more predominant rock units exposed in the cliffs of southern Oak Creek Canyon are the buff to white colored, frequently cross-bedded Permian Coconino Sandstone and the red sandstones of the Permian Schnebly Hill Formation. Unlike all the other formations exposed in Oak Creek Canyon, the Schnebly Hill Formation is not present at the Grand Canyon. The youngest rocks exposed in the canyon are a series of basalt lava flows that form the east rim, the youngest of which is an estimated 6 million years old.

Recreation

Oak Creek Canyon is located within the Coconino National Forest. Portions of the canyon have been designated federal wilderness areas as part of the Red Rock-Secret Mountain Wilderness. The United States Forest Service operates several campgrounds, picnic areas, and recreation areas within the canyon. Slide Rock State Park, home to a natural water slide along Oak Creek, is also located within Oak Creek Canyon. Other recreational activities include swimming and fishing in Oak Creek. There are 49 fishable miles along the creek where rainbow trout, brown trout, largemouth bass, smallmouth bass, catfish (channel) and catfish (flathead) can be found. Hiking the many trails leading into side canyons or up to the rim of the canyon is a popular activity for the area.

2014 Slide Fire
On May 20, 2014, at around 4 PM, a wildfire was reported just north of Slide Rock State Park. The fire was 100% contained on June 4, 2014, with 21,227 acres burned. Total personnel included over 1,230 firefighters, 50 crews, 29 engines, and 9 helicopters.

After the fire, the Sedona Fire District installed nine outdoor warning sirens throughout the canyon. They are used for situations including wildfires, flash flooding, severe weather, and other emergencies. The siren system is tested yearly, in the summer months.

See also
 List of rivers of Arizona

References

External links

 Coconino National Forest: Oak Creek Canyon
 Arizona Boating Locations Facilities Map
 Arizona Fishing Locations Map
 Where to Fish in Arizona Species Information 
 Arizona Lake Levels
 Oak Creek Canyon information

Mogollon Rim
Canyons and gorges of Arizona
Rivers of Coconino County, Arizona
Coconino National Forest
Tourist attractions in Coconino County, Arizona
Rivers of Arizona